The California Racing Association (CRA) was a racing governing body which set rules and hosted Sprint car racing events in Southern California. 

The association was formed in the garage of Babe Ouse in 1945. Originally it was called the California Roadster Association. Ouse, a dry lakes record holder in a Marmon, was tired of racing against the clock and, with the help of Bill Dehler and Emmett Malloy, built a race track blocks away from the dirt lot that would become  Ascot Park. That first track was known as Carrell Speedway and Judge Carrell & Christopher J.C. Agajanian were the driving forces behind both tracks and the CRA itself.
Sprint cars were introduced in 1953 and the name was changed in 1957 to the California Racing Association, or CRA.

In 1978, Gary Sokola became president and instituted several new safety measures, including the national 410 limit, the tire rule and padded roll cages. Sokola left the CRA to join the USAC and Frank Lewis took over. He would be the last president, as things declined for the sport shortly thereafter. Ascot raceway closed in 1990 and the CRA was left without a home track. Lewis tried expanding the sport across the state and various parts of the country, increasing the purse and spending thousands on advertising out of his pocket to keep the show going.

In 1993, a scheduled race was cancelled at the Ventura Raceway. A majority of members formed the SCRA and honored the date. The CRA was suspended indefinitely in 1994 after just four races, with Bobby Michnowicz leading the point standings by one point over Leland McSpadden. No Champion was crowned.

Legends
Many sprint car legends have come from the ranks of CRA. Stars include Bob Hogle, Billy Wilkerson, Jimmy Oskie, Bobby Olivero, Rick Goudy, Buster Venard, Dean Thompson, Bubby Jones, Brad Noffsinger, Eddie Wirth, Rip Williams, John Redican, Ron Shuman, Lealand McSpadden, Richard Griffin, Billy Boat, Mike Kirby, Mike Sweeney, Stan McElrath and many more. The CRA became a natural stepping stone to more sophisticated racing, including the Indy 500, as 19 winners of the Indy 500 got their starts from track roadster racing.

Presidents

CRA Champion drivers

External links 
 https://web.archive.org/web/20110716105640/http://www.racingwest.com/news/articles/19667-california-roadster-association-15th-annual.html

References 

Sports governing bodies in the United States